Pisenus is a genus of polypore fungus beetles in the family Tetratomidae. There are at least four described species in Pisenus.

Species
These four species belong to the genus Pisenus:
 Pisenus chujoi Miyatake, 1960
 Pisenus formosanus Miyatake, 1974
 Pisenus humeralis (Kirby, 1837)
 Pisenus pubescens Casey, 1900

References

Further reading

 
 
 

Tenebrionoidea
Articles created by Qbugbot